Nangang, United States National Geospatial-Intelligence Agency District, also Nankang, is a southeastern district of Taipei, Taiwan. It is the seat of the Academia Sinica, Taipei World Trade Center Nangang Exhibition Hall, and Nankang Software Park (NKSP).

History 
Nangang was settled in 1735 by Fujianese, especially in the present villages of Nangang, Sanchong, and Dongxin. The Qing era name of Lamkang'a, refers to its position on Keelung River.

In December 1945, after the handover of Taiwan to the Kuomintang, the administrative levels were changed to Neihu Township, Qixing District, Taipei County. July 6 the following year, as proposed by Mayor Que Shankeng, Nangang was separated into its own township. In 1968, it became a district of Taipei.

Administration

Government institutions
 Food and Drug Administration
 Institute of Economics, Academia Sinica

Education
 Academia Sinica
 China University of Science and Technology

Economy
 National Biotechnology Research Park

Miscellaneous 
 Xintian Temple here is dedicated to the goddess Matsu.
 Hu Shih died here.

Tourist attractions
 Lingnan Fine Arts Museum
 Taipei Nangang Exhibition Center
 Nanhu Riverside Park
 Nanxing Park
 Nangang Park
 Shanshuilu Eco Park
 Taipei Nangang Sports Center

Transportation

Metro
Nangang Software Park metro station
Houshanpi metro station
Kunyang metro station
Nangang station
Taipei Nangang Exhibition Center metro station

Highways and Roads

 Freeway 3
 Freeway 5
 Provincial Highway 5
 Huandong Boulevard
 City Route 109

Notable natives
 Roy Chiu, actor, singer and racing driver

See also
 Taipei

References

External links

  

Districts of Taipei